Martín Vásquez Gómez (born December 24, 1963) is an American former professional soccer player. The first of five players to have played for both the United States and Mexico, he has served as a coach since retiring.

Playing career

Youth and college
Vasquez and his family moved to Los Angeles at age 12. He attended Alhambra High School in Alhambra, California, where he was a high school All-American soccer player. After high school, he returned to Mexico to briefly play for the B side of the Leones Negros de Guadalajara.

In 1981, Vasquez entered California State University, Los Angeles, playing on the men's soccer team from 1981 to 1983. During his first two years, he spent the college off-season with Cojumatlan in the San Gabriel Valley Soccer League, in El Monte, California.

Club
In the fall of 1984, Vasquez signed with the Los Angeles Lazers of the Major Indoor Soccer League. He then played for the Hollywood Kickers of the Western Soccer Alliance. That fall, he joined the Memphis Storm in the American Indoor Soccer Association, where he scored seventeen goals and added nineteen assists in twenty-three games, ranking second on the league's points list.

In 1987, Vasquez returned to the Kickers, now renamed the California Kickers. In 1988, Cachorros de la Universidad de Guadalajara signed the player, based on the recommendation of Hugo Salcedo, president of the Kickers. In 1990–91, he represented Puebla, moving to Veracruz in the following campaign.

In 1992, Vasquez joined Atlas, leaving four years later to return to the United States, with the establishment of Major League Soccer. That year, he was allocated to the Tampa Bay Mutiny, and spent two season with them, before rounding out his MLS career with the San Jose Clash in 1998. The next year, he played for the Orange County Zodiac in the USL A-League.

International

Mexico
Vasquez played three games with the Mexico national team one of them being against Colombia in April of 1990 under manager Manuel Lapuente and the other two against Russia, during César Luis Menotti's spell as coach. However, none of the matches he played for his birth nation were FIFA-sanctioned.

United States
Vasquez received American citizenship in 1996. Subsequently, he was called up to the United States national team by Steve Sampson, going on to earn seven caps in a two-year span. His debut came on December 21, 1996, against Guatemala (2–2 away draw), in a 1998 World Cup qualifier, and he last appeared in the home 4–2 victory over El Salvador, for the same competition, on November 16, 1997. He started the game, then came off in the 63rd minute for Mike Sorber.

Coaching career
After retiring from his playing career, Vasquez worked as assistant coach with Cal Poly Pomona and the women's team San Diego Spirit. He also coached the Damien High School boys' team for two seasons. After one season as assistant with the Los Angeles Galaxy, he joined newly created MLS team Chivas USA in the same capacity, on January 2, 2005.

Between July 2008 and April 2009, Vasquez worked as the assistant to Jürgen Klinsmann at German club FC Bayern Munich. He left when Klinsmann was dismissed due to bad results. Vasquez was hired to his first head coaching job on December 2, 2009, at former club Chivas.

Vasquez was released from his duties following a season which saw the Goats miss the playoffs for the first time since its 2005 expansion campaign.

Vasquez was recalled by Klinsmann after the latter was named head coach of the United States men's national team as an assistant coach for a friendly against Mexico on August 11, 2011. On March 31, 2014, less than 3 months before the World Cup Vasquez was replaced by Tab Ramos, relegating him to unannounced "other responsibilities", which later turned out to be scouting and match observations.

On 14 April 2022, Vasquez was named head coach of USL League One side Central Valley Fuego FC.

Managerial statistics

References

External links
 
 

1963 births
Living people
American soccer players
American soccer coaches
Mexican footballers
Mexican football managers
Footballers from Jalisco
People from Yahualica, Jalisco
Mexican emigrants to the United States
American sportspeople of Mexican descent
Association football utility players
California State University, Los Angeles alumni
Los Angeles Lazers players
California Kickers players
Memphis Storm players
Leones Negros UdeG footballers
Club Puebla players
C.D. Veracruz footballers
Atlas F.C. footballers
Tampa Bay Mutiny players
San Jose Earthquakes players
Orange County Blue Star players
Major Indoor Soccer League (1978–1992) players
Western Soccer Alliance players
American Indoor Soccer Association players
Liga MX players
Major League Soccer players
A-League (1995–2004) players
Dual internationalists (football)
Mexico international footballers
United States men's international soccer players
Major League Soccer All-Stars
LA Galaxy non-playing staff
Chivas USA non-playing staff
FC Bayern Munich non-playing staff
Chivas USA coaches
Real Salt Lake non-playing staff
United States men's national soccer team non-playing staff
Real Monarchs coaches
Houston Dynamo FC non-playing staff
Major League Soccer coaches
USL Championship coaches